Mi-hee, also spelled Mee-hee, is a Korean feminine given name. Its meaning differs based on the hanja used to write each syllable of the name. There are 33 hanja with the reading "mi" and 24 hanja with the reading "hee" on the South Korean government's official list of hanja which may be registered for use in given names.

Some ways of writing this name include:
 (아름다울 미, 아름다울 희): both hanja mean "beautiful"

People with this name include:
Chang Mi-hee (張美嬉, born 1957), South Korean actress
Eun Meehee (born 1960), South Korean novelist
Gwak Mi-hee (born 1974), South Korean cross-country mountain biker

See also
List of Korean given names

References

Korean feminine given names